Gilboa Regional Council (Mo'atza Azorit (ha)Gilbo'a) is a regional council in northern Israel, located on the slopes of the Gilboa mountain range. There are more than 22,000 residents in 38 settlements as of 2007.  The size of the area is about 250,000 acres.

It is bordered on the north and west by the Jezreel Valley and the Jezreel Valley Regional Council; on the east by the Beit She'an Valley and the Beit She'an Valley Regional Council, and on the south by the West Bank's Samarian mountains.

History
The Gilboa mountains that border the Jezreel Valley from the south and the Beit She'an Valley from the west form a part of the "water dividing line" of the land of Israel. In 1921, 75 men from Joseph Trumpeldor's work group built a tent camp near Ma'ayan Harod. Most of them were immigrants to Israel during the Second Aliyah, and some arrived in the Third Aliyah. Some of them were members of Hashomer. The program was the "building up of the land by a general commune of Israeli workers". After two months, an additional group added to the eastern border of the Jezreel Valley and settled on the hill of Tel Hassan, which is now Tel Yosef. The other settlements were built later.

List of communities
The following settlements belong to the Gilboa Regional Council:

Kibbutzim
Beit Alfa
Beit HaShita
Ein Harod (Ihud)
Ein Harod (Meuhad)
Geva
Heftziba
Tel Yosef
Yizre'el

Moshavim
Adirim
Avital
Barak
Dvora
Gadish
Kfar Yehezkel
Magen Shaul
Meitav
Mlea
Moledet
Nir Yafeh
Prazon
Ram-On
Ramat Tzvi

Community settlements
Gan Ner
Gidona
Merkaz Haver
Merkaz Oman
Merkaz Yael

Arab villages
Muqeible
Na'ura
Sandala
Tamra
Taibe

Former villages
Nurit

Economy

Agriculture
There are many branches of agriculture performed in the settlements of the council. The most widespread ones are cotton, wheat, greenhouses and other industrial plantings, flower plantings, field crops, fish pools, stables for cows, and chicken coops.

Industry
The kibbutzim in the council have built many factories: canned food in Beit HaShita; metalworking in Beit Alfa, Moledet, Ein Harod and Beit Yosef; carpentry in Beit HaShita and Ein Harod; electronics in Yizre'el; nut cracking in Geva; plastics in Heftzibah and Ram On; printing and ornamentation in Moledet and Tel Yosef.

External links 

  

 
Regional councils in Northern District (Israel)